Raymond Drai (born October 14, 2003) is an American professional soccer player who plays as a midfielder for MLS Next Pro side Rochester New York FC.

Club career
Drai played with USSDA academy side Real So Cal and also in the USL academy tournament for FC Golden State.
He also played with Fulham F.C in 2019.

On September 11, 2020, Drai joined USL Championship side Orange County SC.

Career statistics

Club

References

External links
Profile at the US Soccer Development Academy website

2003 births
Living people
American soccer players
Association football midfielders
Orange County SC players
Rochester New York FC players
USL Championship players
Soccer players from California
MLS Next Pro players